Greg Lindquist (born May 9, 1979) is an American artist, painter and sculptor based in New York City.

Biography
Greg Lindquist was born in Wilmington, North Carolina, graduated from Emsley A. Laney High School in 1997, studied art and English at North Carolina State University, and attended graduate school in New York at Pratt Institute, earning an MFA in painting and masters in art history. He also was a studio participant at the Whitney Museum of American Art Independent Study Program (ISP). During graduate school, Lindquist was a research intern at the Museum of Modern Art, writing wall labels for the permanent collection. He also worked as an assistant for the artist Ryan McGinness. Lindquist's early work addressed landscape as a memorial, confronting the gentrification of the deindustrialized Brooklyn waterfronts of  Williamsburg and Red Hook in late capitalism. Addressing the entropic forces in architecture, he traveled to Tbilisi, Georgia to research decay from the Soviet Union era.  The Dan River coal ash spill in 2014 has been the conceptual, visual, thematic, and political driver of his  Smoke and Water project. Working in partnership with Working Films, he created an installation of paintings and murals from an image shared by a waterkeeper documenting ash swirling with river water. The work was completed collaboratively with the local art, ecology, and activist communities. Lindquist works with the guiding principle that art can facilitate social change, actively creating space for the possibility of mobilizing political action and reshaping common values. In 2015, he was Guest Critic for the November issue of The Brooklyn Rail and curated a concurrent show, Social Ecologies which focused on the intersections and ruptures between art and ecology. Returning to NYC as a site of research, Lindquist has continued his engagement with community-centered, ecologically driven interventions through research on the Newtown Creek, a critically polluted waterway on the Brooklyn and Queens border. Working with the Newtown Creek Alliance, he has assisted with water quality collection and has reviewed EPA clean-up plans while serving on a technical data committee. He also co-organized an ongoing series of collaborative research events on a human-powered rowboat in the Newtown Creek's autonomous zone with up-close, site-specific fieldwork and painting.

One-person exhibitions and projects
2017

"Smoke and Water: Catawba", Partnership with Art in Buildings, Monroe, NC

2014

"Smoke and Water", Partnership with Working Films, Wilmington, NC

2009

"Brooklyn Industry", Brooklyn Academy of Music, Brooklyn, NY

2008

"Remembrance of Things Present", NC State University, College of Design, Raleigh, NC. Travels to Bethel University, St.Paul, MN.

Awards and residencies
Marie Walsh Sharpe Residency Participant (2013-2014)
Milton & Sally Avery Foundations Grant (2009)
2008-09 Pollock-Krasner Foundation Grantee (2009)
Art Omi International Artists' Residency Participant, (2009)

Group exhibitions

2016
"Altered Land", North Carolina Museum of Art, Raleigh, NC

2012
"Broken Desert - Land and Sea", University of Arizona Museum of Art, Tucson, AZ
"Art on Paper 2012", Weatherspoon Art Museum, Greensboro, NC

2010
"Planet of Slums", curated by Omar Lopez-Chahoud and La Toya Frazier, Rutgers University, New Brunswick, NJ (2010); Third Streaming, NY, NY (2011)
"Frozen Moments: Architecture Speaks Back", Ministry of Transportation Project, organized by Laura Palmer Foundation (Poland), Tbilisi, Georgia

Bibliography

2017
"Murals with Morals" Creative Loafing Charlotte

2016
Smoke and Water Catalogue

2015
"By this River: Greg Lindquist Paints Against Coal-Ash Pollution", artcritical.com

2014
"Culcalorus 20: Q+A with installation artist Greg Lindquist", Wilmington Star News
"Coal Ash Impact Concerns Expressed through Art, Film", Lumina News
"Focus on Coal Ash Art at Festival", Wilmington Star News
"Surface Tension: Greg Lindquist in Conversation with Charlie Schultz", Artslant 
"Greg Lindquist on WetLand, Empathy, and Boat Cuisine"
"On PAINTING, PLACE AND THE POLITICAL" by Greg Lindquist 
"Greg Lindquist" by Orit Gat, Bomb
"Duke Energy, Greg Lindquist and Mary Mattingly", The Huffington Post
"Environmental Art", The News and Observer 
"Kline and Lindquist Talk Site Specificity and Art Fairs", NY Arts Magazine

2013
Warsza, Joanna, ed. Ministry of Highways: A Guide to the Performative Architecture of Tbilisi, Sternberg Press

2012
Corwin, William. "Must-See Shows in New York", Saatchi Magazine Online
"Greg Lindquist in conversation with Tom McGrath", BOMBlog
McClermont, Doug. "Greg Lindquist at Elizabeth Harris Gallery", ARTnews
McKee, Christina, "Past the City Limits: Greg Lindquist Breaks New Ground", artcritical.com

2011
White, Amy. "New American landscapes at Flanders", Independent Weekly
Tikhonova, Yulia. "Greg Lindquist at Elizabeth Harris", Sculpture
Neil, Jonathan TD. "Planet of Slums", Art Review

2010
Frazier, La Toya. "La Toya Frazier and Greg Lindquist ", Bomb Magazine
Landi, Ann. "Critic's Pick", ArtNEWS, March
Miller, Daniel. "Postcard from Tbilisi", Frieze Magazine on-line

2009
Laneri, Raquel. "The Wasteland: Greg Lindquist's Industrial Landscapes", The South Wing, NY, NY
Distil, Sara. "Jen Bekman Artist to Watch: Greg Lindquist", Flavorwire, NY, NY
"Plenty for $20: Greg Lindquist's 20x200 Edition", New York Press, NY, NY

2008
"Greg Lindquist at Elizabeth Harris", Art in America, October 2008
"On the Waterfront", Independent Weekly, Raleigh, Durham, Chapel Hill, NC, September
"Artist Freezes Urban Landscape in Flux", The News and Observer, Raleigh, NC, August 24, 2008
"Art picks: Greg Lindquist at NCSU College of Design", The News and Observer, Raleigh, NC, August 22, 2008
"Urban Landscapes at Elizabeth Harris", Art News, September, 2008
"Remembrance of Things Present, " Essay by Cary Levine for NCSU and Bethel Exhibition Brochure, August, 2008
"He Paints the Town", NC State Alumni Magazine, Summer 2008
"Testing the Urban Topography", The New York Sun", June 18, 2008
"Findings", Harper's Magazine, July issue, 2008
"Brooklyn Industries", interview, New York Arts Magazine, May–June issue, 2008
"Memorializing the Industrial Brooklyn", feature, Greenpoint Gazette, Mar 6, 2008
"Rackstraw Downes at Betty Cuningham and Greg Lindquist at Elizabeth Harris", review, artcritical.com, Mar 1, 2008
"Factory Guy", review, The New York Sun, Feb 21, 2008
The James Kalm Report YouTube Channel, Feb 20, 2008
"Fade to Grey", review, New York Arts Magazine, Feb 19, 2008
"To Brooklyn" interview feature, The Morning News, Feb 11, 2008
"Construction Sight" feature, Brooklyn Based, Feb 7, 2008
"Brooklyn Construction and Destructoporn as Art" feature, Curbed.com, Feb 7, 20082007'"A 'Naked' Lure for Artists", The New York Sun, June 28, 2007
"Brooklyn in Ruins", review in the New York Observer, March 21, 2007
"I Art Brooklyn", review in Brooklyn Paper, March 24, 2007
"Q & A with Greg Lindquist", interview in Go Brooklyn'', March 24, 2007

External links
 Official website

1979 births
20th-century American painters
American male painters
21st-century American painters
21st-century American male artists
American landscape painters
Sculptors from North Carolina
Living people
Art Students League of New York people
North Carolina State University alumni
People from Wilmington, North Carolina
Pratt Institute alumni
Painters from New York City
20th-century American sculptors
20th-century American male artists
American male sculptors
Sculptors from New York (state)